The High Rock Canyon Hills is a mountain range in Humboldt County, Nevada.

References 

Mountain ranges of Humboldt County, Nevada
Mountain ranges of Nevada